Ōmiya Hachiman Shrine may refer to:
 Ōmiya Hachiman Shrine (Hyōgo), a shinto shrine in Miki, Hyōgo, Japan
 Ōmiya Hachiman Shrine (Tokyo), a shinto shrine in Suginami, Tokyo, Japan